Bipin Singh Thounaojam (born 10 March 1995) is an Indian professional footballer who plays as a winger for Indian Super League club Mumbai City and the India national team.

Club career

Youth career
At the age of 13, Bipin joined one of Manipur's most famous youth clubs called Wafa Wangoi Club where he stayed for three years. He then moved on to Manipur Police Sports Club where he further honed his skills.

I-League

Shillong Lajong
After years of consistent displays, a 17-year-old Bipin found his way the senior setup of Shillong Lajong for the 2012–13 I-League season. He made his professional debut for Shillong Lajong in the I-League on 22 December 2012 against ONGC at the Jawaharlal Nehru Stadium when he came on as an 81st-minute substitute for Gbeneme Friday as Shillong Lajong lost the match 3–0. For the first three seasons, he mostly came on as a substitute to replace tired legs or for a change of tactics. He only became a first teamer for the club from the 2015–16 I-League under the stewardship of head coach Thangboi Singto. It took him over 4 years to score his first professional goal of his career and the club, against Chennai City on 19 February 2017, when he curled a sublime effort into the top corner, giving the opposition goalkeeper absolutely no chance to save it. He made 38 appearances for the club in the I-League, scoring a solitary goal in the process.

ISL

ATK
Bipin was picked up by the erstwhile ATK during the player draft ahead of the 2017-18 Indian Super League season. He made his debut for the club on 17 November 2017, when he came on as a 74th-minute substitute against Kerala Blasters in a match which finished 0-0. He scored his first goal for the club in only his second appearance, when he curled in a brilliant free-kick which kissed the crossbar and went in. Though Bipin's goal was a mere consolation as ATK lost 4–1 to Pune City. He finished the season with 2 ISL goals in 12 appearances. He showed flashes of brilliance and an impressive work rate.

Mumbai City
On 1 August 2018, the Islanders completed the signing of Bipin on a two-year contract. He made his debut for the club against Jamshedpur on 2 October 2018, which ended in a 2–0 loss. Though playing time was hard to come by for Bipin under head coach Jorge Costa for the first two seasons. He started only 6 games of the 22 under him. He scored his first goal for the club during the 2019-20 Indian Super League season on 12 February 2020 against Goa in a 5–2 loss.

However, it wasn't until the 2020-21 Indian Super League season, with Spaniard Sergio Lobera in charge of the club, that Bipin finally came alive. Six goals, including a hat-trick against Odisha on the penultimate date of the 2020-21 Indian Super League regular season, which also was the first hat-trick of the season, and a dream match winning goal in the 2021 Indian Super League final against ATK Mohun Bagan, as the Islanders won the Indian Super League Winners Shield and the League title for the first time.

On 19 April 2021, Bipin signed a new four-year contract with Mumbai City, keeping him at the club until May 2025. On 14 September 2022, Bipin became the all-time joint goalscorer for Mumbai City alongside Modou Sougou, when he scored a 90th-minute winner against Mohammedan in the semi-finals of the Durand Cup.

International career
On 2 March 2021, Bipin Singh got selected for the 35-man-squad national camp ahead of India national team's friendlies against Oman and UAE. On 25 March, he made his debut against Oman, which ended as 1–1.

Career statistics

Club

International

Honours
Mumbai City
Indian Super League: 2020–21
Indian Super League League Winners Shield: 2020–21
 Durand Cup runner-up: 2022

Individual
 Indian Super League Hero of the Month: November 2022

References

External links 
 

1995 births
Living people
I-League players
Indian Super League players
ATK (football club) players
Mumbai City FC players
Association football midfielders
Indian footballers
Shillong Lajong FC players
Footballers from Manipur
India international footballers